Marima Rodríguez (born 2 March 1953) is a Cuban athlete. She competed in the women's high jump at the 1972 Summer Olympics.

References

External links
 

1953 births
Living people
Athletes (track and field) at the 1972 Summer Olympics
Cuban female high jumpers
Olympic athletes of Cuba
Central American and Caribbean Games medalists in athletics
People from Palma Soriano